Ursula Moray Williams (19 April 1911 – 17 October 2006) was an English children's author of nearly 70 books for children.  Adventures of the Little Wooden Horse, written while expecting her first child, remained in print throughout her life from its publication in 1939.

Her classic stories often involved brave creatures who overcome trials and cruelty in the outside world before finding a loving home.  They included The Good Little Christmas Tree of 1943, and Gobbolino, the Witch's Cat first published the previous year.  It immediately sold out but disappeared until re-issued in abridged form by Kaye Webb at Puffin Books twenty years later, when it became a best-seller.

Life
Williams was born in Petersfield, Hampshire, by ten minutes the younger of identical twins.  She and her sister Barbara Árnason were talented artists and for six years from the age of ten wrote and illustrated books for each other's birthdays and at Christmas.

Both were enthusiastic Girl Guides, attending some of the movement's first camps, and some of Ursula's early books were collections of stories she had told to her own Brownie pack. The girls were also keen riders – on hobby horses at first.  To save for a pony they kept goats, selling their milk which they refused to drink themselves.

Thanks to their uncle, the publisher Stanley Unwin, the twins visited the Alps, which later inspired some of Ursula's most vivid writing, most notably the trilogy that began with The Three Toymakers.  Its final volume, The Toymaker's Daughter, was among her most celebrated creations.

Williams' greatest source of ideas, however, was the house in which she spent her teenage years, North Stoneham House, a large, dilapidated mansion set in woodland north of Southampton.  Events from her childhood recur repeatedly in her fiction, with North Stoneham described at greatest length in the 1941 A Castle for John-Peter and depicted in Faith Jaques’ illustrations for Grandpapa's Folly and the Woodworm-Bookworm of 1974.

She was a friend of Puffin Books editor Kaye Webb, and organised riotous parties for the Puffin Club, of which she was made the first honorary member. She worked with illustrators like Shirley Hughes, Faith Jaques and Edward Ardizzone.

Much of her later writing included disruptive, but essentially good-hearted children, and was influenced by her work as a juvenile magistrate and as a highly involved school governor.  Locally, she was greatly admired for her many acts of kindness and an instinctive Christian faith.

Personal problems, including her brother's threatened suicide, family crises, the death of her husband, the loss of an eye, and her near death to cancer, interrupted her work, but Williams went on writing until the age of 80, and achieved the longest published career of any children's writer of her generation.

She married Conrad Southey "Peter" John in 1935. They lived at Hampton, near Kingston upon Thames, then Esher, before moving to Gloucestershire in 1942, and Beckford, Worcestershire, in 1945. Peter died in 1971. They had four sons, three of whom survived her. She died in 2006 at Tewkesbury in Gloucestershire.

Many of Williams' manuscripts and further correspondence are held at Seven Stories, the Centre for Children's Books in Newcastle.

An exhibition, marking the centenary of her birth, opened in Winchester in April 2011.

Books

 1931 Jean-Pierre
 1932 For Brownies: Stories and Games for the Pack and Everybody Else
 1933 Grandfather
 1933 The Pettabomination
 1933 The Autumn Sweepers and Other Plays
 1934 Kelpie, the Gipsies' Pony (Harrap), illustrated by Ursula and Barbara Moray Williams, 
 1934 More for Brownies
 1935 Anders & Marta
 1935 Adventures of Anne 
 1936 Tales for the Sixes and Sevens
 1936 Sandy on the Shore
 1936 The Twins and Their Ponies
 1937 The Adventures of Boss and Dingbatt, as by Ursula John, photos by Conrad Southey John, 
 1937 Elaine of La Signe
 1937 Dumpling
 1938 Adventures of the Little Wooden Horse
 1939 Peter and the Wanderlust; later called Peter on the Road
 1939 Adventures of Puffin
 1940 Pretenders; Island
 1941 A Castle for John-Peter
 1942 Gobbolino, the Witch's Cat
 1943 The Good Little Christmas Tree
 1946 The Three Toymakers
 1946 The House of Happiness
 1948 Malkin's Mountain – sequel to The Three Toymakers
 1948 The Story of Laughing Dandino
 1951 The Binklebys at Home
 1951 Jockin the Jester – historical fiction
 1953 The Binklebys on the Farm
 1955 Grumpa
 1955 Secrets of the Wood
 1956 Goodbody's Puppet Show
 1957 Golden Horse with a Silver Tail
 1958 Hobbie
 1958 The Moonball
 1959 The Noble Hawks; U.S. title: The Earl's Falconer – historical fiction
 1959 The Nine Lives of Island MacKenzie
 1963 Beware of This Animal
 1964 Johnnie Tigerskin
 1964 O for a Mouseless House
 1965 High Adventure
 1967 The Cruise of the Happy-Go-Gay
 1968 A Crown for a Queen
 1968 The Toymaker's Daughter – sequel to The Three Toymakers
 1969 Mog
 1970 Boy in a Barn
 1970 Johnnie Golightly and his Crocodile
 1970 The Three Toymakers
 1971 Hurricanes – four volumes of short stories for backward readers
 1972 A Picnic with the Aunts
 1972 Castle Merlin
 1972 The Kidnapping of My Grandmother
 1972 Children's Parties (and Games for a Rainy Day)
 1973 Tiger Nanny
 1973 The Line
 1974 Grandpapa's Folly and the Woodworm-Bookworm
 1975 No Ponies for Miss Pobjoy
 1978 Bogwoppit
 1981 Jeffy, The Burglar's Cat
 1982 Bellabelinda and the No-Good Angel
 1984 The Further Adventures of Gobbolino and the Little Wooden Horse – sequel
 1985 Spid
 1986 Grandma and the Ghowlies
 1987 Paddy on the Island

References

Sources
 Davison, Colin (2011). Through the Magic Door: Ursula Moray Williams, Gobbolino and the Little Wooden Horse. Northumbria Press. .

External links

Independent obituary
 The Guardian obituary 
 

1911 births
2006 deaths
British identical twins
People from Petersfield
English children's writers
Blind writers
English twins
English women novelists